System Modules (originally known as System Building Blocks; the name was changed around 1961) are a DEC modular digital logic family which preceded the later FLIP CHIPs. They connect to the units they are plugged into via a set of 22 gold-plated discrete pins along one edge.

They use transistor inverter circuits, with the transistors operating saturated, to avoid dependence on tight tolerances; they use -3V and 0V as logic levels. Intended for prototyping as well as production, they include design features intended to avoid damage. They are provided with design advice which includes loading rules and wiring instructions.

They were available in several compatible speed lines:

 4000-Series: the second series, nominally 500 KHz, but some 1 MHz
 1000-Series: the original series, nominally 5 MHz
 6000-Series: higher speeds, nominally 10 Mhz
 8000-Series: very high speeds, nominally 30MHz

In addition, special modules were available for purposes such as Input/Output (I/O) converters (to standard internal voltages), bus drivers, lamp and solenoid drivers, A/D conversion, relays, core memory drivers, etc.

Larger assemblies which are part of the same family provide core memory testing devices. There are also power supplies, mounting panels with slots for the modules, cabinets to hold groups of mounting panels, indicator light panels, etc.

References
Citations

Sources

External links
DEC Building Block Logic manual from the Computer History Museum, dated September 1960
Digital Logic Handbook, Third Edition, dated March 1961.
New Module Accessories, dated February 1964
30 Megacycle Modules, dated September 1964
System Modules, dated 1968.

DEC hardware